Ioannis Rousoglou (born 15 November 1989) is a Greece international rugby league footballer who plays for the Aris Eagles.

Playing career
In 2020, Rousoglou trialled with French Elite Two Championship team Villeghailhenc-Aragon XIII, playing 2 games.

In 2022, Rousoglou was named in the Greece squad for the 2021 Rugby League World Cup, the first ever Greek Rugby League squad to compete in a World Cup.

References

External links
Greece profile
Greek profile

1989 births
Greece national rugby league team players
Living people
Rugby league props
Rugby league second-rows